Merve Boluğur (born 16 September 1987) is a Turkish actress and model. She is well known for her roles in fantasy series Acemi Cadı (the Turkish version of Sabrina the Teenage Witch), Küçük Sırlar (the Turkish version of Gossip Girl), Kuzey Güney and  historical series Muhteşem Yüzyıl.

Filmography

Film

Television

Music videos

Discography

Personal life
On 24 August 2015, Boluğur married Murat Dalkılıç at Adile Sultan Palace.
 On 11 August 2017, they filed for divorce, which was finalized on 11 September 2017. Boluğur married DJ Mert Aydın on 2 October 2022. They divorced on 23 November 2022.

References

External links
 
 

1987 births
Living people
Actresses from Istanbul
Turkish film actresses
Turkish television actresses